A rural area is a geographic area that is located outside cities and towns.

Rural may also refer to:

Places
 Rural, Indiana, an unincorporated community in Randolph County
 Rural, Ohio, an unincorporated community in Clermont County
 Rural, Wisconsin, an unincorporated community in Dayton, Waupaca County

Arts, entertainment, and media
 Rural TV, a British television channel
 The Rural Channel, a Canadian television channel

Other uses
 Feist v. Rural, a decision by the Supreme Court of the United States
 La Rural, an agricultural and livestock show in Buenos Aires, Argentina
Universidad Rural, a school in Guatemala

See also 
 Rural Township (disambiguation)